Euzophera is a genus of snout moths. It was described by Philipp Christoph Zeller in 1867.

Species
Subgenus Euzophera Zeller, 1867
Euzophera albicostalis Hampson, 1903
Euzophera alpherakyella Ragonot, 1887
Euzophera bigella (Zeller, 1848)
Euzophera cinerosella (Zeller, 1839)
Euzophera costivittella Ragonot, 1887
Euzophera formosella (Rebel, 1910)
Euzophera lunulella (Costa, 1836)
Euzophera nessebarella Soffner, 1962
Euzophera osseatella (Treitschke, 1832)
Euzophera perticella Ragonot, 1888
Euzophera pinguis (Haworth, 1811) – tabby knot-horn
Euzophera pulchella Ragonot, 1887
Euzophera rubricetella (Herrich-Schäffer, 1855)
Euzophera subcribrella Ragonot, 1887
Euzophera tetragramma (Rebel, 1910)
Euzophera umbrosella (Staudinger, 1880)
Subgenus Cymbalorissa Gozmány, 1958
Euzophera fuliginosella (Heinemann, 1865)
Subgenus unknown
Euzophera afflictella Ragonot, 1887
Euzophera aglaeella Ragonot, 1887
Euzophera albipunctella Ragonot, 1887
Euzophera atuntsealis Roesler, 1973
Euzophera batangensis Caradja, 1939
Euzophera climosa Dyar, 1914
Euzophera cocciphaga Hampson, 1908
Euzophera comeella Roesler, 1973
Euzophera conquassata Roesler, 1970
Euzophera conquistador Dyar, 1914
Euzophera cornutella (Roesler, 1965)
Euzophera crassignatha Balinsky, 1994
Euzophera crinita Balinsky, 1994
Euzophera decaryella (Marion & Viette, 1956)
Euzophera eureka Roesler, 1970
Euzophera fibigerella Asselbergs, 1997
Euzophera flagella (Lederer, 1869)
Euzophera flavicosta Turner, 1947
Euzophera habrella Neunzig, 1990
Euzophera hemileuca de Joannis, 1927
Euzophera hudeibella Roesler, 1973
Euzophera hulli Asselbergs, 2009
Euzophera mercatrix (Meyrick, 1937)
Euzophera mienshani (Caradja, 1939)
Euzophera minima Balinsky, 1994
Euzophera mabes Dyar, 1914
Euzophera magnolialis Capps, 1964
Euzophera neomeniella Ragonot, 1888
Euzophera nigricantella Ragonot, 1887
Euzophera ostricolorella Hulst, 1890 – tuliptree borer, root collar borer
Euzophera paghmanicola Roesler, 1973
Euzophera postflavida Dyar, 1923
Euzophera pyriell Yang, 1994
Euzophera rinmea Dyar, 1914
Euzophera sagax Meyrick, 1935
Euzophera scabrella Ragonot, 1888
Euzophera sogai Roesler, 1982
Euzophera speculum de Joannis, 1927
Euzophera scabrella Ragonot, 1888
Euzophera semifuneralis (Walker, 1863) – American plum borer
Euzophera stramentella Ragonot, 1888
Euzophera subnitidella Ragonot, 1887
Euzophera termivelata Balinsky, 1994
Euzophera tintilla Dyar, 1914
Euzophera trigeminata Warren & Rothschild, 1905
Euzophera ultimella Roesler, 1973
Euzophera villora (C. Felder, R. Felder & Rogenhofer, 1875)
Euzophera vinnulella Neunzig, 1990

References

Phycitini
Pyralidae genera